Second-seeded Mary Carter defeated Thelma Long 3–6, 6–2, 9–7 in the final to win the women's singles tennis title at the 1956 Australian Championships.

Seeds
The seeded players are listed below. Mary Carter is the champion; others show the round in which they were eliminated.

 Mary Hawton (semifinals)
 Mary Carter (champion)
 Beryl Penrose (quarterfinals)
 Fay Muller (quarterfinals)
 Thelma Long (finalist)
 Daphne Seeney (semifinals)
 Loris Nichols (quarterfinals)
 Lorraine Coghlan (quarterfinals)

Draw

Key
 Q = Qualifier
 WC = Wild card
 LL = Lucky loser
 r = Retired

Finals

Earlier rounds

Section 1

Section 2

References

External links
 

1956 in women's tennis
1956
1956 in Australian tennis
1956 in Australian women's sport